Ruzhany Palace is a ruined palace compound in Ruzhany village, Pruzhany Raion (district), Brest Voblast (province), Western Belarus. The castle is currently undergoing systematic reconstruction, with the palace ornate gate and entry building being already restored.

History 

Ruzhany began its life in the late 16th century as the site of Lew Sapieha's castle, the palace being completed in 1602. The Sapieha residence was destroyed in the course of the internecine strife in the Grand Duchy of Lithuania when it was attacked by Michał Serwacy Wiśniowiecki's forces in 1700.

Ruzhany Palace was rebuilt as a grand Neoclassical residence in the 1770s by Aleksander Michał Sapieha, employing the services of the architect Jan Samuel Becker of Saxony, who set the palace in an English park landscape. Aside from the palace, there was a theatre (1784–88), an orangery and several other outbuildings. Becker also designed the local church (rebuilt in the 1850s).

By the time of King Stanisław II's visit in 1784, work on the palace had been suspended. The Sapieha estates were nationalised in the aftermath of the November Uprising (1831). Three years later, the palace compound was sold to be used as a textile mill and weaving factory.

 
In 1914 the palace was accidentally set on fire by factory workers. The First World War and subsequent financial hardships prevented the building's restoration until 1930, however the partially restored palace became a ruin again within fifteen years, a casualty of the Second World War. The ornate palace gate survives and has recently been restored.

See also
Biaroza monastery, a family vault of the Sapieha family not far from Ruzhany
Halshany Castle, another ruined Sapieha residence in Belarus
List of castles in Belarus

References

External links 

 Photos at Radzima org. 
 Photos at Globus 
 Belarus Guide 
 Unofficial Ruzhany site 

Former palaces
Castles in Belarus
Buildings and structures in Brest Region
Ruins in Belarus
Palaces in Belarus
Ruined palaces
Sapieha